The Northwest Collegiate Rowing Conference (NCRC) consists of seven NCAA Division II and III member schools in USRowing's Northwest region.  Its mission is to provide for the advancement of small college and university rowing within the northwest primarily through the organization and administration of a championship regatta.

Eligibility
The only eligibility requirements for membership is that the program be located within USRowing's northwest region, and that member programs be from NCAA Division II or Division III programs.  In addition, each program must maintain a commitment to the constitution and bylaws. Member programs may be either varsity or club status within their respective institutional setting.

Members

Regattas
The Conference hosts two major regattas each year.  The NCRC Invite takes place during late-March on Vancouver Lake, Washington and has welcomed non-conference members from California, Oregon, and Washington.  Conference championships are annually held the third weekend of April at the Cascade Sprints Regatta on Lake Stevens, Washington.

Conference Champions
Each year the Conference Champion is recognized based on team points received at the Championship Regatta at Lake Stevens WA or Dexter Lake OR.

See also
College rowing

References

External links
Conference Constitution
NCRC Webpage